Conforto may refer to:

Giovanni Giacomo Di Conforto (1569–1630), Italian architect and engineer
Giovanni Luca Conforti or Conforto (1560–1608), Italian composer and prominent falsetto singer
Nicola Conforto (1718–1793), Italian composer
Tracie Lehuanani Ruiz-Conforto (born 1963), American Olympic medalist in synchronized swimming
Michael Conforto (born 1993), American professional baseball player

See also
Conforte
Conforti

Comfort